The A4161 is a main road in Cardiff, Wales, United Kingdom. The main purpose of the road is to link the city centre with the M4 motorway in the west at junction 33, and in the east with the A48(M) motorway at St Mellons.

History
The 1923 route of the A48 was the main east–west link in south Wales.  The A48 in Cardiff was re-numbered to the A4161 on 19 November 1971 when the Eastern Avenue dual carriageway became the A48. By 2 November 1975, Queen Street was partly pedestrianised and 2 subways were opened under North Road and Boulevard de Nantes to allow the A4161 then to move from Queen Street to Dumfries Place, Stuttgart Strasse, Boulevard De Nantes. The A48 section between Rumney and St Mellons later became the B4487 and Southern Way (A4232) was built in 1978.

Old A48 route

From east to west:
 Newport Road
 Queen Street
 Duke Street
 Castle Street
 Cowbridge Road East

Current route

From east to west it runs through the following roads in Cardiff:

 From Southern Way west along Newport Road
 Dumfries Place
 Stuttgarter Strasse
 Boulevard De Nantes

The road then follows the A470 from North Road (alongside Cardiff Castle through to Duke Street, before becoming the A4161 again from:

 Castle Street, and over Cardiff Bridge
 Cowbridge Road East
 Wellington Street
 Atlas Road
 Lansdowne Road
 Cowbridge Road East again, ending at Ely Bridge (roundabout on the A48)

Types of road

Notes 
 Cardiff & Newport A-Z Street Atlas 2007 Edition

References 

Roads in Cardiff